Guillermo Francisco Pfaab Romano (born 11 October 1968) is an Argentine former rower. He competed at the 1992 Summer Olympics and the 1996 Summer Olympics.

It was announced in November 2020 that he had been appointed technical director of the El Salvador Olympic Committee.

Notes

References

External links
 
 
 

1968 births
Living people
Argentine male rowers
Olympic rowers of Argentina
Rowers at the 1992 Summer Olympics
Rowers at the 1996 Summer Olympics
Place of birth missing (living people)
Pan American Games medalists in rowing
Pan American Games gold medalists for Argentina
Rowers at the 1995 Pan American Games
Rowers at the 1999 Pan American Games
Medalists at the 1999 Pan American Games